Lavhe is a village in the Karmala taluka of Solapur district in Maharashtra state, India.

Politician :-

 श्री.नारायण (आबा) पाटील हे 2014 ते 2019 मध्ये करमाळतालुक्याचे मा.आमदार होते.

 श्री.अतुल (भाऊ) पाटील हे डब्बल (दुहेरी) उपमहाराष्ट्र केसरी आहेत. तसेच करमाळा येथील पंचायत समितीचे मा.सभापती आहेत.

 श्री.विलास (दादा) पाटील हे करमाळ्यातील मा.पंचायत समितीचे सदस्य होते. त्याच बरोबर लव्हे गावचे सरपंच आहेत.

Demographics
Covering  and comprising 282 households at the time of the 2011 census of India, Lavhe had a population of 1367. There were 716 males and 651 females, with 180 people being aged six or younger.

References

Villages in Karmala taluka